Sunnycroft is a Victorian suburban villa, located in Wellington, Shropshire.

Location 

Located in the market town of Wellington, Shropshire, England, and owned by the National Trust as one of their more unusual properties. It is close to the town centre in Wellington, on the B5061 Holyhead Road, originally the Shrewsbury to London road, and formerly part of Watling Street the Roman road from London to Wroxeter.

Suburban villas were almost 'country estates in miniature' that attempted to emulate upper class mansions on a middle class budget. Many have either been modernised, renovated or refurbished out of recognition over the last 60 years or so or have been demolished and replaced with later housing, converted into offices or residential care homes, or have been broken up into flats and smaller residences.

Rare Survivor 

Sunnycroft was built in 1880, and extended in 1899. Uniquely the house remained in the same family from its completion in 1899, until it was bequeathed to the National Trust in 1997.

Sunnycroft remains intact, complete with the original interior fixtures and fittings, many of which are still in place and therefore has a unique character and intimacy that is often lacking from larger properties but very evocative of its time and place. 

The National Trust summarises Sunnycroft as:
 A late 19th-century gentleman's villa – typical creation of Victorian era suburbia
 Rare unaltered interior, with an elaborate conservatory
 A mini country-estate, with pigsties, stables, kitchen garden and orchards
 Colourful borders and summertime flower displays
 Superb long avenue of Redwood trees and lime trees

Gallery

See also
Listed buildings in Wellington, Shropshire

External links

Sunnycroft - National Trust

Country houses in Shropshire
Gardens in Shropshire
National Trust properties in Shropshire
Buildings and structures in Telford
Country parks in Shropshire
Historic house museums in Shropshire
Wellington, Shropshire